Clifford Brooks (born 19 August 1944) is a Barbadian athlete. He competed in the men's decathlon at the 1972 Summer Olympics.

References

1944 births
Living people
Athletes (track and field) at the 1972 Summer Olympics
Barbadian decathletes
Olympic athletes of Barbados
Place of birth missing (living people)